Chibuike Josh Alfred professionally known as Josh2Funny is a Nigerian comedian, actor and musician.

Biography 
Josh2Funny was born in Anambra State on 18 December 1990. He moved to Lagos with his parents when he was eight years. He shot into limelight when his skit #DontLeaveMe went viral.

Filmography 
 Lagos Real Fake Life (2018)
 Money Miss Road (2022)

References 

1990 births
Living people
Male actors from Lagos
Nigerian male film actors
Nigerian male comedians
Igbo comedians
Nigerian comedians
Nigerian stand-up comedians
Nigerian television personalities
Nigerian media personalities
Nigerian entertainment industry businesspeople
People from Anambra State
Nigerian male musicians